Macroscepis   is a genus of plants in the family Apocynaceae, first described as a genus in 1819. It is native to Latin America and the West Indies.

Species

formerly included
moved to Gonolobus, Matelea, Oxypetalum 
 Macroscepis dutrae now  Gonolobus dutrae 
 Macroscepis longiflora now  Matelea longiflora 
 Macroscepis retusa now  Oxypetalum retusum

References

Asclepiadoideae
Apocynaceae genera